{{DISPLAYTITLE:C22H26N2O3}}
The molecular formula C22H26N2O3 may refer to:

 Geissoschizine methyl ether
 Hirsuteine
 16-Methoxytabersonine
 Pseudoakuammigine

Molecular formulas